Scotinosphaera facciolae is a species of algae belonging to the family Scotinosphaeraceae.

The species inhabits freshwater environments.

References

Ulvophyceae